The Académie Royale de Danse, founded by Letters Patent on the initiative of King Louis XIV of France in March 1661, was the first dance institution established in the Western world. As one of King Louis’ first official edicts after the death of royal adviser Jules Mazarin, the “Letters Patent of the King to Establish a Royal Academy of Dance in the City of Paris” represented a critical step towards the young King's wielding of consolidated personal power. Structurally, the Académie consisted of thirteen dancing masters selected by King Louis XIV for being the “most experienced in the Art [of dance].” This "experience" was determined by each dancer's history of success in previous royal productions of ballets de cour. Most famously, eight of the selected dancing masters performed with King Louis XIV during his portrayal of Apollo, the Sun King, in Le Ballet de la nuit (1653). Although the object of the Académie was to reflect, analyze and normalize matters of dance, no document relating to its activity or to this theorization has survived. The Académie Royale de Musique, founded in 1669 as the Académie d'Opéra, was a closely related opera and ballet company, and although the two institutions never merged, members of the dance academy were also associated with the opera. Little by little, recruitment of dancers into the royal entourage gave way to recruitment into the ballet-corps of the Opéra. This slowly altered the Académie's profile, making it and its members more dedicated to dance training alone. By 1775, the Académie was nearing the end of its life. On joining the Académie, Jean-Georges Noverre, one of ballet d’action’s most influential choreographers, commented on its ineffectiveness in making meaningful contributions to the dance world. But Noverre’s dismissive remarks concerning the organization cannot be taken at face value, since on a number of accounts, his statements are polemical, biased and misleading. It is often claimed that the Académie ceased to exist after 1778, merely because a list of the thirteen members was no longer published after this date, or alternatively after 1789, with the coming of French Revolution and the abolition or nationalization of royal institutions. In a tribute to his deceased brother Maximilien published in the  Courrier des spectacles  (30 September 1798), Pierre Gardel, the head choreographer at the Paris Opéra at that time, writes that “these positions, which came with a pension [of 500 livres], passed in turn to the most distinguished dancers. Citizens [Auguste] Vestris and [Pierre] Gardel, currently at the Théâtre de la République et des Arts, are the last to have enjoyed these.” It appears then that the Académie was indeed defunct by 1798. The opera and ballet company has survived and today is known as the Opéra National de Paris.

Objectives 
In the introduction to the Letters Patent, King Louis XIV cites the corruption of dance (primarily in his own court) as motivation for establishing the Académie. He goes on to charge the appointed dancing masters with restoring “the art of dancing to its original perfection and [improving] it as much as possible.”

It is important to note that Letters Patent of this kind were only customarily written from the King's perspective; it is unlikely King Louis’ personal convictions regarding the state of the art are actually represented here. This becomes clear when the Letters Patent are compared to those which established the Académie Française in 1635 and Académie Royale de Peinture et Sculpture in 1648; both mentioned the Académies would serve to right artistic disrepair and were promulgated well before King Louis’ was old enough to draft policy.

Due to the King Louis’ probable lack of involvement in the edict, it has been argued that the establishment of the Académie was primarily motivated by the dancing masters themselves. Using their proximity to the King and other royals in ballets de cour, the dancers were able elevate their profession above guild status while simultaneously securing wealth and influence.

In service of the broad objective to revitalize dance, the Letters provided sweeping powers to the Académie which brought the art squarely under royal control. Statute VIII of the Letters required all new dances in France—of any description—be reviewed and accepted by a majority of the Académie members (académistes) before they could be performed. In addition, Statute III established that dance instructor licenses were to be distributed solely by the approval of the académistes. The Letters left no ambiguity: it would be up to the Académie to define Parisian dance. Other statues, like VII and XI, went beyond the académistes, requiring all professional dancers in Paris and the surrounding area to be officially registered with the Académie; the best of that number were then expected to be available for casting in court ballets at the whim of the King.

Legacy 
Since no archives of the Académie have been found, it has not been possible to evaluate in detail its activities and accomplishments. Despite this, it is still possible to trace the organization's influence through indirect means.

Dance historian Maureen Needham suggests the founding of the Académie may have been at least partly responsible for the end of ballets de cour proper. As ballet became more formalized at the hands of the Académie, the technical ability required to perform choreography went up substantially, quickly outpacing the skill of non-professional courtiers. Unable to keep up with the steps, members of the court could not dance alongside their accomplished masters as they did in the days of Le Ballet de la nuit (1653) and were thus consigned to observing performances from the sidelines. Countering declining numbers of courtiers dancing, the population of professional dancers expanded substantially.

More concretely, King Louis XIV requested the development of a dance notation system by the académistes. Pierre Beauchamp, director of the Académie in 1680, provided one which was later co-opted, refined, and popularized by Raoul Auger Feuillet, after whom the notation system was subsequently named.

Something of the organization’s purpose can be gleaned from an entry in the  Spectacles de Paris  (1778: 29-30):

"Independent of the Royal Academy of Music [i.e., the Paris Opéra], there is an Academy of Dance, the meetings of which are held at the director’s [home]. This Royal Academy of Dance was set up by Louis XIV in 1661, through  lettres patentes  ratified by  parlement  in 1662. The number of academy members is fixed at thirteen, and they enjoy the privilege – as do their children – of demonstrating the art of dance without  lettres,  as well as the right of  committimus  and other such, like those of the  Officiers Commensaux  of the  Maison du Roi. 
	They are to meet once a month in order to deliberate on whatever concerns their art. One of the main purposes of this Academy is to train  sujets  [i.e., soloists] for the Opéra."

The 13th Member Controversy 
While the published “Letters Patent of the King to Establish a Royal Academy of Dance in the City of Paris” specifies thirteen dancing masters were to lead the Académie, the corresponding list of names numbers only twelve. Based on cross-referencing mentions of the organization's thirteen members with other documents, however, it is clear the number is correctly stated. The identity of the omitted thirteenth member has long been a point of disagreement among dance historians. Gaston Vuillier forwarded Beauchamp as the missing member, while Régine Astier (Kunzel) unabashedly claimed it was Henri Prévost. Both were wrong. The original document signed by King Louis XIV was preserved in the French National Archives, and upon its close inspection in 1997 by scholar Maureen Needham, the thirteenth name was revealed to be “Molière.”

Not to be confused with Jean-Baptiste Poquelin Molière (1622–73), the famous playwright of King Louis’ reign responsible for ballets such as Le Bourgeois Gentilhomme (1670), the Molière mentioned in the text is accompanied by “La Jeune” translated into English as “the young” or “the younger.” Given Poquelin was never known by such a title, it indicates “Molière” is rather the courtly spelling of “Mollier” as in Louis de Mollier (1615–88) an acclaimed dancer and musician of the court. Of course, Louis de Mollier is older than Jean-Baptiste Poquelin Molière, however historical records (such as pg.103 of the Mercure Galant, July 1677) show Louis de Mollier was commonly known as “le petit Molière,” likely due to his waning popularity in comparison Poquelin.[8] It is thus feasible that “Molière La Jeune” is equivalent to “Molière le petit.”

Dance scholar Rose Pruiksma offers yet another possibility. Citing the gender of the name used in the official edict: “La” Jeune (female) rather than “Le” Jeune (male), the mysterious deletion of the name in all official court documents, and the definitive lack of youth in Louis de Mollier by 1661 (he would be forty-six), Pruiksma proffers the daring hypothesis that “Molière La Jeune” is perhaps Marie Blanche Mollier (1644-1733), the daughter of “Molière le petit.” In her own right, Marie Mollier was an accomplished dancer of ballets de cour and was no stranger to the stage of Louis XIV by the time of the Académie's establishment. As Pruiskma indicates, the addition of a female dancing master in the Académie provides a compelling reason for the thirteenth name to be wiped from official court documentation, and would explain the development of female dancers in Le Triomphe de l’amour at the Paris Opéra in 1681. Of course, while the name “Molière La Jeune” indicates youthfulness, Marie Mollier's age, only seventeen in 1661, makes her being the 13th “senior” académiste still highly contested.

The Saint-Julien Conflict
The dance academy's members (académistes) formed part of the king's entourage and court and were, for the most part, simultaneously both dancers and musicians. It was this that motivated the fraternity of musicians of Saint-Julien to publish a virulent factum against the "" in 1664. This long , entitled , was signed by Guillaume Dumanoir, "violin player to His Majesty, one of the 25 members of his "grand' Bande", and also holder of the Office de Roy of the Instrument Players, and of the dance masters of France".  The quarrel was settled in 1695, by a decree according the same rights to both parties.

Founding Letters Patent

Members

See also
 Paris Opera Ballet
 French art salons and academies

References

Notes

Sources
 Astier, Régine (1998). "Académie Royale de Danse" in Cohen 1998, vol. 1, pp. 3–5.
 Christout, Marie-Françoise (1998). "Paris Opera Ballet" in Cohen 1998, vol. 5, pp. 86–100.
 Cohen, Selma Jeanne, editor (1998). International Encyclopedia of Dance. Oxford: Oxford University Press.  (hardcover).  (2004 paperback edition).
 Craine, Debra; Mackrell, Judith (2000). The Oxford Dictionary of Dance. Oxford: Oxford University Press. .
 Harris-Warrick, Rebecca (1992). "Paris. 2. 1669–1725. (i) The Académie Royale de Musique (Opéra)" in Sadie 1992, vol. 3, p. 856.
"Mercure Galant, juillet 1677 – Mercure Galant, OBVIL" obvil.sorbonne-universite.site Retrieved 2018-10-24.
Miller, Elizabeth Maxfield (1959). "Molière and His Homonym Louis de Mollier. in Modern Language Notes vol. 74 pp. 612-621.
Needham, Maureen (1997). "Louis XIV and the Académie Royale de Danse, 1661: A Commentary and Translation" in Dance Chronicle vol. 20 pp. 173–190.
Pruiksma, Rose A. (2003). "Generational Conflict and the Foundation of the Académie Royale de Danse: A Reexamination" in Dance Chronicle vol. 26 pp. 169–187.
 Sadie, Stanley, editor (1992). The New Grove Dictionary of Opera (4 volumes). London: Macmillan. .
 Some of the information on this page was translated from the corresponding article in the French Wikipedia.

Performing arts education in France
Dance schools in France
Ballet schools
Arts and culture in the Ancien Régime
1661 establishments in France